The BSFA Awards are literary awards presented annually since 1970 by the British Science Fiction Association (BSFA) to honour works in the genre of science fiction. Nominees and winners are chosen based on a vote of BSFA members. More recently, members of the Eastercon convention have also been eligible to vote.

BSFA Award categories
The award originally included only a category for novels. Categories for short works and artists were added in 1980. The category for younger readers was added in 2021. The artists category became artwork in 1986 and a category for related non-fiction was added in 2002. A media category was awarded from 1979 to 1992. The ceremonies are named after the year that the eligible works were published, despite the awards being given out in the next year. The current standard award categories are:
 BSFA Award for Best Novel
 BSFA Award for Best Short Fiction
 BSFA Award for Best Non-Fiction
 BSFA Award for Best Artwork
 BSFA Award for Best Fiction for Younger Readers

Previous categories:
 BSFA Award for Best Media

BSFA Award winners

Notes

See also
 Hugo Award
 Nebula Award
 Locus Award

References

External resources
 BSFA website
 List of all winning and nominated novels

 
Awards established in 1970
1970 establishments in the United Kingdom
British fiction awards
Science fiction awards